Haystack Mountain is a  mountain topped with an observation tower that is the chief features of Haystack Mountain State Park, a public recreation area in the town of Norfolk, Connecticut.

The  Haystack Mountain Tower, built in 1929 and listed on the National Register of Historic Places, sits upon it. The tower provides a view over the town of Norfolk and the neighboring town of Canaan.

Common forms of wildlife found on the mountain include raccoons, bears, deer, coyotes, opossums, skunks and foxes. The dominant plant life include mountain laurel (the state plant), pine trees and maples.

References

External links

Haystack Mountain State Park Connecticut Department of Energy and Environmental Protection 
Haystack Mountain State Park Map Connecticut Department of Energy and Environmental Protection

Landforms of Litchfield County, Connecticut
Mountains of Connecticut
Norfolk, Connecticut
State parks of Connecticut
Protected areas established in 1917
1917 establishments in Connecticut